Wait, My Youth (Chinese: 等等我的青春, pinyin : Děng děng wǒ de qīngchūn) is a 2019 Chinese television series starring Zhao Yi Qin, Li Jiaqi, Li Ge Yang, Leo Dong, Stephanie Xu, and Vincent Wei. The drama was aired on Youku Original Network from March 2019 to April 18, 2019.

Synopsis

Wait, My Youth is a story about warmth of family, friendship, and love. This story mainly revolves around the love and friendship of Su Can Can. Su Can Can has a secret crush on her classmate Lin Jia Ze but soon falls in love with Lan Tian Ye, who's the best friend of Lin Jia Ze.

Cast

Main

Supporting

Soundtrack

External links 
 
 Wait, My Youth on Douban

References

Chinese romance television series
2019 web series debuts
2019 Chinese television series debuts
2019 Chinese television series endings
Chinese romantic comedy television series